The spiny miner bee (Andrena aculeata) is a species of miner bee in the family Andrenidae.

References

Further reading

 
 

aculeata